Three ships of the Royal Navy have borne the name HMS Coreopsis, named after the flowering plant coreopsis.
 , an  sloop of the First World War
 HM Drifter Coreopsis II, an armed drifter credited with sinking the German submarine  in April 1918

Royal Navy ship names